David Murray Hereora (9 August 1956 – 5 August 2014) was a New Zealand trade unionist and politician. He was a list MP for the Labour Party from 2002 to 2008.

Early life
Hereora was born in 1956. He was a worker at Affco Meatworks and became a trade union organiser.

Political career

Hereora was first elected to Parliament in the 2002 election, standing against National's Judith Collins in Clevedon but nevertheless entering Parliament as a list MP. He was Māori Vice-President of the Labour Party. Hereroa served until 2008 as Chair of the Māori Affairs Select Committee.

In 2008, Judith Collins won the Papakura electorate. After leaving Parliament Hereora returned to union organising, working with the Service & Food Workers Union in mediation talks at the Papakura Griffin Foods manufacturing plant.

He died on 5 August 2014. Labour leader David Cunliffe paid tribute, saying that Hereora "dedicated his life to the fight for low income workers."

References

1956 births
2014 deaths
New Zealand Labour Party MPs
Māori MPs
New Zealand trade unionists
New Zealand list MPs
Māori politicians
Members of the New Zealand House of Representatives
Unsuccessful candidates in the 2008 New Zealand general election
21st-century New Zealand politicians